Filloy is a surname. Notable people with the surname include:

Ariel Filloy (born 1987), Argentine-Italian basketball player
Juan Filloy (1894–2000), Argentine writer